A cattle feeder is a farmer who buys or rears cattle to add weight and quality to the cattle for the meat industry.

References

Agricultural occupations